Bogusław Kowalski (born 23 October 1964 in Mircze) is a Polish politician.

He was elected to Sejm on 25 September 2005 getting 6274 votes in Siedlce constituency, running for the League of Polish Families.

See also
Members of Polish Sejm 2005-2007
Members of Polish Sejm 2007-2011

External links
Bogusław Kowalski - parliamentary page - includes declarations of interest, voting record, and transcripts of speeches.

1964 births
Living people
People from Hrubieszów County
Members of the Polish Sejm 2005–2007
Members of the Polish Sejm 2007–2011